David Samuel Nwolokor (born 10 January 1996) is a Nigerian football goalkeeper who plays for Rijeka.

Career
Born in Port Harcourt, Nwolokor moved from the Nigerian Abuja Football College Academy to HNK Rijeka in 2014. In July 2014, soon after arriving, he signed a two-year contract with the club. In his first season with Rijeka, he played for Rijeka II in Croatia's third division. In early 2015, he was an unused substitute for Rijeka's first team in four Prva HNL matches. 

In July 2015, Rijeka sent Nwolokor on a season-long loan to Šibenik in Croatia's second division. This was followed by season-long loans to Vitez in the Premier League of Bosnia and Herzegovina and iClinic Sereď in Slovakia. 

Nwolokor made his official debut for Rijeka on 7 October 2020, keeping a clean sheet in a cup tie against Dilj.

References

External links

1996 births
Living people
Sportspeople from Port Harcourt
Nigerian footballers
Nigerian expatriate footballers
Association football goalkeepers
HNK Rijeka players
HNK Rijeka II players
HNK Šibenik players
NK Vitez players
ŠKF Sereď players
NK Aluminij players
First Football League (Croatia) players
Premier League of Bosnia and Herzegovina players
Slovak Super Liga players
Slovenian PrvaLiga players
Expatriate footballers in Croatia
Expatriate footballers in Bosnia and Herzegovina
Expatriate footballers in Slovakia
Expatriate footballers in Slovenia
Nigerian expatriate sportspeople in Croatia
Nigerian expatriate sportspeople in Bosnia and Herzegovina
Nigerian expatriate sportspeople in Slovakia
Nigerian expatriate sportspeople in Slovenia